Henriquezia is a genus of three species of shrubs or trees in the family Rubiaceae, native to the Amazon basin.

Species
Henriquezia jenmanii
Henriquezia nitida
Henriquezia verticillata

References
Rogers, G.K. (1984):Gleasonia, Henriquezia, and Platycarpum (Rubiaceae).Flora Neotropica Monograph Number 39. [monographic revision]

External links
Photos of Henriquezia nitida at New York Botanical Garden site

Rubiaceae genera
Henriquezieae